The Cordycipitaceae are a family of parasitic fungi in the Ascomycota, class Sordariomycetes and order Hypocreales. The family was first published in 1969 by mycologist Hanns Kreisel, but the naming was invalid according to the code of International Code of Nomenclature for algae, fungi, and plants. It was validly published in 2007.

Description
Cordycipitaceae species have stromata or subicula that are pallid or brightly pigmented and fleshy. Their perithecia are superficial to completely immersed in the substrate, and oriented at right angles to the surface of the stroma. The asci are cylindrical with a thickened ascus tip. Ascospores are usually cylindrical, contain multiple septa, and disarticulate into part-spores or remain intact at maturity.

Genera
Updated in 2020 to 21 genera; (with amount of species)

Akanthomyces  (21)
Amphichorda  (1)
Ascopolyporus  (7)
Beauveria  (54) – anamorph
Beejasamuha  (1)
Blackwellomyces  (2)
Cordyceps  (498)
Coremiopsis  (2)
Engyodontium  (5) – anamorph
Flavocillium  (4)
Gamszarea  (8)
Gibellula  (29)
Hevansia  (8)
Hyperdermium  (3)

Leptobacillium  (1)
Liangia  (1)

Neotorrubiella 
Parengyodontium  (1) 

Pseudogibellula  (1)

Samsoniella  (3)
Simplicillium  (12)  – anamorph

See also
Ophiocordycipitaceae

References

External links

 
Ascomycota families